Alte Aller refers to several old branches of the river Aller in Lower Saxony, Germany.

See also
List of rivers of Lower Saxony

Rivers of Lower Saxony
0
Rivers of Germany